Charles R. Beitz (born 1949) is an American political theorist. He is Edwards S. Sanford Professor of Politics at Princeton University, where he has been director of the University Center for Human Values and director of the Program in Political Philosophy. His philosophical and teaching interests focus on global political theory, democratic theory, the theory of human rights and theories of property.

Beitz received his Ph.D. from Princeton University. He taught at Swarthmore College from 1976 to 1991, where he chaired the department of political science. He joined Bowdoin College in 1991 as dean for academic affairs and professor of government and legal studies. He returned to Princeton in 2001 as professor of politics and was appointed to the Edwards S. Sanford Chair in 2006. He was editor of Philosophy and Public Affairs from 1999 to 2010. He has held research appointments at Harvard, Columbia, Oxford, and Stanford, and fellowships from the Rockefeller Foundation, American Council of Learned Societies, MacArthur Foundation, American Council on Education, and Guggenheim Foundation.

Beitz's work, along with that of Brian Barry, Thomas Pogge and Henry Shue, has been among the most important and influential in the literature concerning global justice. Of significant interest is his promotion of a cosmopolitan translation of John Rawls's Justice as Fairness domestic theory to the international sphere. His most significant work, his 1979 book Political Theory and International Relations, inspired a  symposium in the journal Review of International Studies in 2005. Contributors to this journal edition include Chris Brown, David Miller, Simon Caney, Catherine Lu and Nicholas Rengger. His The Idea of Human Rights (2009) won the Estoril Global Issues Book Award in 2011 and was the subject of a symposium in Critical Review of International Social and Political Philosophy (expected 2022). He was elected a Fellow of the American Academy of Arts and Sciences in 2008.

Publications

Books
  
 Beitz, Charles R. Political Equality: An Essay in Democratic Theory. Princeton: Princeton University Press, 1989.
 Beitz, Charles R. The Idea of Human Rights. Oxford. Oxford University Press, 2009

Articles
 Beitz, Charles R. "Justice and International Relations." Philosophy and Public Affairs, Vol. 4 No 4 (summer 1975): 360-389
 Beitz, Charles R. “Rawls’s Law of Peoples.” Ethics 110:4 (2000) : 669–696.
 Beitz, Charles R. “Human Rights as a Common Concern.” The American Political Science Review 95:2 (2001): 269–282.
 Beitz, Charles R. “What Human Rights Mean.” Daedalus, 132: 1 (2003), 36–46.
 Beitz, Charles R. “Human Rights and the Law of Peoples.” In The Ethics of Assistance, morality and the distant needy, ed. Deen K. Chatterjee. Cambridge: Cambridge University Press, 2004.
 Beitz, Charles R. "Does Global Inequality Matter?" Metaphilosophy 32:1 (2003): 95–112.

References

1949 births
American political scientists
Bowdoin College faculty
Fellows of the American Academy of Arts and Sciences
Harvard Kennedy School staff
Living people
Princeton University alumni
Princeton University faculty
Stanford University staff
Swarthmore College faculty